"Loop-the-Loop" is the 16th single of the J-pop singer Kotoko, released on October 20, 2010. The title track is used as the opening theme for the anime series Motto To Love-Ru, the sequel to the anime adaptation of To Love-Ru.

This single was released in two editions: the CD+DVD edition (GNCV-0025) and CD-only edition (GNCV-0026). The DVD contains the promotional video for "'Loop-the-Loop".

Track listing 
"Loop-the-Loop" — 4:13
Lyrics: Kotoko
Composition: Tomoyuki Nakazawa
Arrangement: Tomoyuki Nakazawa, Takeshi Ozaki
 — 5:55
Lyrics: Kotoko
Composition/arrangement: C.G mix
"Loop-the-Loop" (Instrumental)

Charts and sales
Daily chart - #14
Weekly chart - #18
First week sales - 4,304 units

References

2010 singles
Kotoko (singer) songs
Anime songs
Songs with lyrics by Kotoko (musician)
2010 songs